= Deserter USA =

- Directed by: Lars Lambert
- Starring: Bill Jones; John Ashley
- Release date: 1969
- Country: Sweden
- Language: English
- Budget: $100,000

Deserter USA is a 1969 Swedish film about Americans living in Sweden to avoid the draft.

It stars American John Ashley - not the actor by that name but an American who deserted and sought asylum in Sweden.

The director Lars Lambert later went to jail for refusing the draft in Sweden.
